Samsung Health (originally S Health) is a free application developed by Samsung that serves to track various aspects of daily life contributing to well being such as physical activity, diet, and sleep. Launched on 2 July 2012, with the new Samsung smartphone, the Galaxy S3, the application was installed by default only on some smartphones of the brand. It could also be downloaded from the Samsung Galaxy Store.

History 
Since mid-September 2015, the application is available to all Android users. From 2 October 2017, the app is available for iPhones from iOS 9.0.

The application is installed by default on some Samsung smartphone models and can not be removed without root. It is possible to disable this application.

The app changed its name from S Health to Samsung Health on 4 April 2017, when it released version 5.7.1.

Dashboard
The dashboard is the main display of the application. This is the main novelty introduced during the redesign of the application in April 2015 in version 4.1.0. The table shows on one page, a general overview of the most recent data saved. In addition, it provides direct access to each feature. Its composition and layout are customizable.

Features

Note: Some features are tracked by testing with phone sensors or phone accessories(Fitbit, Galaxy Active, Galaxy Fit, etc...)and some features are tracked by user input. (food/calories, weight, water amount, etc...)

Main features
Setting goals or using the goals suggested by the app to improve its results 
Pedometer 
Weekly summaries of the main features 
Activity tracking taking into account market and sports sessions 
Dietary monitoring (calories and nutrients absorbed) 
Weight tracking 
Sleep monitoring

Other features
Ratings of the number of steps in different groups (all users, age group or friends)
Global challenges
Creating challenges on the number of steps 
Measurement of heart rate via dedicated hardware  
Monitoring of water consumption 
Monitoring of blood sugar 
Measurement of blood oxygen saturation (SpO2) by Pulse oximetry via dedicated hardware 
Stress monitoring/measurement

Heart rate measurement
The availability of the heart rate measurement function coincides with the release of the Samsung Galaxy S5 which has a built-in sensor. This function is limited to take the measurement punctually and at rest. The same sensor is made to also measure Pulse oximetry and stress levels.

The application also supports heart sensors from other manufacturers. It is able to generate a graph as a function of time of the different frequencies reached during a sports session as well as other information such as the average and maximum heart rate reached.

On Samsung Galaxy S5 / S5 Neo / S6 / S7 / S8 / S9 / S10 and Edge versions as well as Galaxy Note 4 / 5 / 7 / FE / 8, the application can measure the heart rate with the sensor on the back of the device. The heart rate measurement feature is not supported on Samsung Note 10's and Galaxy S10e's.

Pedometer
Step counting is a feature that is integrated with Samsung Health with the arrival of the Samsung Galaxy S4 in April 2013.

The default goal is to reach 10,000 steps per day. This number would be a recommendation of the World Health Organization according to the French Federation of Cardiology.

The app also calculates other data such as the distance traveled, the number of calories burned and the number of steps taken at a good pace. According to the application information, a good rhythm is obtained when a rate of at least 100 steps per minute is maintained for ten minutes.

At the visual level, we can use the data with different graphics:
On a 24-hour day with a histogram showing activity (number of steps) in 24-minute increments (60 slices of 24 minutes in one day)
Daily, weekly and monthly trends showing the average number of daily steps taken.
You can choose the source of the recorded data. Either we use the smartphone data or those recorded by a compatible Samsung accessory.

Be more active
This function measures the daily activity expressed in minutes. By default the application automatically calculates the running time (more than one hundred steps per minute). The goal to reach is set by default at sixty minutes a day.

You can manually record an activity session (running, walking, hiking, biking). Specific parameters such as distance, duration, route layout, altitude profile, heart rate, calories burned will be recorded according to the chosen activity.

Global challenges
Global challenges were added at the end of May 2017 in version 5.9.0.029. Global challenges last one month and the goal is to walk 100,000 steps. Once your goal is reached, your app will award you a badge. Each challenge features an animal that "gives" a variety of information.

This table lists all global challenges:

In the coming years, global challenges are taking place in the same order as in 2018.

See also
 Apple Health
 Google Fit

References

Android (operating system) software
Samsung software